The Roman Catholic Diocese of Oliveira is a diocese located in the city of Oliveira in the Ecclesiastical province of Belo Horizonte in Brazil.

History
 December 20, 1941: Established as Diocese of Oliveira from the Metropolitan Archdiocese of Belo Horizonte

Bishops
 Bishops of Oliveira (Roman rite)
 Bishop Miguel Ângelo Freitas Ribeiro (2007.10.31 – present)
 Bishop Jésus Rocha (2004.10.20 – 2006.07.13)
 Bishop Francisco Barroso Filho (1983.12.21 – 2004.10.20)
 Bishop Antônio Carlos Mesquita (1977.03.06 – 1983.12.16)
 Bishop José de Medeiros Leite (1945.08.14 – 1977.03.06)

Coadjutor bishop
Antônio Carlos Mesquita (1974-1977)

References

Sources
 GCatholic.org
 Catholic Hierarchy

External links 
 Official website

Roman Catholic dioceses in Brazil
Christian organizations established in 1941
Oliveira, Roman Catholic Diocese of
Roman Catholic dioceses and prelatures established in the 20th century